Vozniak is a surname. Notable people with the surname include:

Ihor Vozniak (born 1951), Ukrainian archbishop
Jaroslav Vožniak (1933–2005), Czech painter and printmaker

See also
 
Voznyak, surname
Woźniak, surname